Joanna Marion Scanlan (born 27 October 1961) is a British actress of Welsh descent. On television, she is known for her roles in British series such as The Thick of It (2005–2012), Getting On (2009–2012), Puppy Love (2014), and No Offence (2015–2018). She was nominated for three BAFTA TV Awards for Getting On, including two for Best Writing.

Scanlan's film appearances include Girl With a Pearl Earring (2003), Notes on a Scandal (2006), The Invisible Woman (2013), and Bridget Jones's Baby (2016). She won a British Academy Film Award and a British Independent Film Award for her performance in the film After Love (2020).

Early life
Scanlan was born on 27 October 1961 in West Kirby, Cheshire, the daughter of hoteliers Michael and Patricia Scanlan. Although born in England, her family comes from North Wales. She moved to North Wales with her parents at the age of three, and her parents later bought the Castle Hotel in Ruthin, Wales when she was 13. Scanlan then grew up in Wales and her mother is Welsh.

She attended Brigidine Convent and Howell's School in Denbigh, as well as New Hall School in Chelmsford, Essex.

She studied history at Queens' College, Cambridge and joined the Cambridge Footlights, where she became friends with Tilda Swinton.

Career
After graduation, Scanlan joined the academic staff of Leicester Polytechnic lecturing in drama for five years, before she undertook a similar role at the Arts Council of Great Britain for three years. After the Arts Council of Great Britain was split in 1994, at age 34 Scanlan decided to try becoming a professional actor, quickly gaining the role as a nurse in ITV1's Peak Practice. This formed somewhat of a theme in her early career, then playing a midwife in The Other Boleyn Girl with Natalie Portman and Scarlett Johansson, before playing a nurse again alongside Ade Edmondson's doctor in ill-fated Doctors and Nurses, and latterly Dr Diana Dibbs in Doc Martin with Martin Clunes.

Scanlan is known for her portrayal of Terri Coverley, the notoriously useless senior press officer for the Department of Social Affairs and Citizenship in the British comedy television series The Thick of It from 2005 to 2012.

Among her successes is Scanlan's critically acclaimed dark satirical NHS drama Getting On, which she starred and co-wrote with Jo Brand and Vicki Pepperdine. The series earned her a BAFTA nomination for Best Female Performance in a Comedy and a BAFTA Television Craft nomination for screenwriting in both 2011 and 2013. They were also nominated for Best Comedy Screenwriting at the Royal Television Awards in 2010 and Best Comedy at the South Bank Sky Arts Awards in 2011. The comedy series was adapted for an American audience with HBO, with Scanlan on board as an executive producer to closely work on script development. Scanlan was a guest star in the American version, reprising her role as Denise Flixter. The Emmy-nominated show ran for three seasons between 2013 and 2015.

Scanlan and Vicki Pepperdine teamed up again to write and star in their BBC Four comedy series Puppy Love, which follows two women at their dog training classes on the Wirral. Under their production company George and George Co., they are currently adapting Puppy Love with HBO for America and a new sitcom This Land is Ours is in development for US Network IFC.

Scanlan plays lead character DI Inspector 'Viv Deering' in Paul Abbott's BAFTA nominated and RTS award-winning primetime drama, No Offence.

Scanlan appeared as Cathy in Bridget Jones's Baby.

Other film credits include Charles Dickens' wife in The Invisible Woman and roles in Get Santa, Testament of Youth, In the Loop, The Bad Education Movie, The Other Boleyn Girl, Stardust, Notes on a Scandal, Girl With A Pearl Earring, Pin Cushion, After Love and Kinky Boots.

Additional television credits include Death Comes To Pemberley, Fungus the Bogeyman, Mapp and Lucia, Heading Out, Stella, Doc Martin, One Foot in the Grave and Spaced.

On stage, Scanlan has worked with Thea Sharrock in her production of Cloud 9 at the Almeida Theatre and Top Girls, with Rufus Norris in Vernon God Little at the Young Vic, and featured in Polly Teale's Madame Bovery.

Scanlan appeared in the first two episodes of McDonald & Dodds in 2020.
In 2021, Scanlon played Ma opposite Bradley Walsh’s Pop in The Larkins.

In March 2022, she received the BAFTA Award for Best Actress in a Leading Role for the film After Love (2020). Scanlan gave thanks in Welsh, "Diolch yn fawr iawn as we say in my country! BAFTA thank you so much...some stories have surprising endings don't they." and also thanked the films writer and director and the crew.

Scanlan is Welsh and learned learned Welsh during S4C's Iaith ar Daith series.

Personal life
Scanlan and her husband Neil live in South Croydon, London.

Scanlan learned Welsh during S4C's Iaith ar Daith series.

Filmography

Film

Television

Awards and nominations

References

External links

Welsh actresses
21st-century Welsh actresses
1961 births
Living people
Academics of De Montfort University
Alumni of Queens' College, Cambridge
Best Actress BAFTA Award winners
British actresses
British comedy writers
British film actresses
British television actresses
People from the Metropolitan Borough of Wirral
People from Ruthin
Actors from Cheshire